The titan triggerfish, giant triggerfish or moustache triggerfish (Balistoides viridescens) is a large species of triggerfish found in lagoons and at reefs to depths of  in most of the Indo-Pacific, though it is absent from Hawaii.

Behavior 

The titan triggerfish is diurnal and solitary. It feeds on sea urchins, molluscs, crustaceans, tube worms and coral. It often feeds by turning over rocks, stirring up sand and biting off pieces of branching coral. This is why other smaller fish species are often seen around it, as they feed on the detritus and smaller organisms that are stirred up. Titan triggerfish have been observed being aggressive to other fish who enter their territory.

Interaction with humans 
The titan triggerfish is usually wary of divers and snorkelers, but during the reproduction season the female guards its nest, which is placed in a flat sandy area, vigorously against any intruders. The territory around the nest is roughly cone-shaped and divers who accidentally enter it may be attacked. Divers should swim horizontally away from the nest rather than upwards which would only take them further into the territory. Although bites are not venomous, the strong teeth can inflict serious injury that may require medical attention.

The threat posture includes the triggerfish facing the intruder while holding its first dorsal spine erect. It may also roll onto its side, allowing it a better look at the intruder it perceives as threatening its nest.  The titan triggerfish will not always bite, but can swim at snorkellers and divers escorting them out of their territory.

The flesh of the titan triggerfish is sometimes ciguatoxic.

References

External links
 

Balistidae
Fish of Palau
Fish of the Indian Ocean
Fish described in 1801